Louder Than Hell may refer to:

 Louder Than Hell (Manowar album), 1996 
 Louder Than Hell (Sam Kinison album), 1986